Children of the Sun is the third studio album by Australian musician Billy Thorpe, released in 1979. The album spawned the singles "Wrapped in the Chains of Your Love", "Goddess of the Night", "Children of the Sun" and "Simple Life". The album peaked at number 44 on the Kent Music Report.

The album was Thorpe's debut album in the United States of America.

In 1987, the album was partially reissued as Children of the Sun...Revisited, featuring 5 songs from the original album, plus 3 newly recorded tracks for the compilation, with "East of Eden's Gate" as the closing track.

Reception
Cash Box magazine called the album "an ambitious rock project" saying "Side one is a fairly mainstream set of guitar rock numbers, but side two is an imaginative, fantasy-like concept work which depicts the massive transporting of human life on Earth to a new destiny in outer space."

Track listings

1987 partial re-issue Children of the Sun... Revisited
 Children Of The Sun (Billy Thorpe, Spencer Proffer) - 6:44
 We're Leaving (Billy Thorpe) - 3:50
 We Welcome You (Billy Thorpe) - 4:43
 Solar Anthem (Billy Thorpe) - 0:56
 The Beginning (Billy Thorpe) - 4:14
 Earth Calling* (Billy Thorpe) - 5:26
 Turn It Into Love* (Billy Thorpe) - 5:08
 Free Enterprise* (Billy Thorpe) - 3:47
 East of Eden's Gate+ (Bill Cuomo, Billy Thorpe, Earl Slick, Jim Johnson, Roderick Falconer, Spencer Proffer) - 6:20

Credits;
Tracks 1-5 taken from the 1979 album Children of the Sun
Tracks 6-8 new recordings for this compilation
Track 9 taken from the 1982 album East of Eden's Gate

Personnel 
 Bass: Leland Sklar
 Drums: Alvin Taylor
 Guitar, vocals: Billy Thorpe
Production
 Art direction: Jim Welch
 Co-producer: Billy Thorpe
 Cover, artwork: Mouse & Kelley
 Design [stylist]: Randee St. Nicholas
 Engineer: Larry Brown
 Mastering: Bernie Grundman
 Vinyl mastering: Bill Kiper
 Photography: Bob Jenkins
 Producer: Spencer Proffer

Charts

References

External links
Billy Thorpe - Children of the Sun @ Discogs
Billy Thorpe - Children of the Sun... Reissued @ Discogs

Billy Thorpe albums
1979 albums
Polydor Records albums
CBS Records albums
Capricorn Records albums
Albums produced by Spencer Proffer